William Edward Harris (born January 29, 1952) is a Canadian former professional ice hockey player in the National Hockey League who played from 1972 to 1984. He helped the New York Islanders reach the NHL playoff semi-finals four times in five seasons from 1975 to 1979.

Playing career
As a youth, Harris played in the 1964 Quebec International Pee-Wee Hockey Tournament with the Toronto Shopsy's minor ice hockey team.

Harris was drafted first overall in the 1972 NHL Amateur Draft by the expansion New York Islanders. He is known for being the first New York Islander. He played on Long Island until he was traded to the Los Angeles Kings on March 10, 1980, along with Dave Lewis for Butch Goring. Later that year, the Islanders won their first Stanley Cup of four in a row. Harris was never part of a winning Cup team, but he is remembered for helping the Islanders grow from their initial days as an expansion franchise to a dominant team in the late 1970s and early 1980s. Harris played more than 500 consecutive games for the Islanders before he was traded.  He finished off the last few seasons of his career with the Los Angeles Kings  and Toronto Maple Leafs before retiring after the 1983–84 season.

Career statistics

References

External links

1952 births
Living people
Canadian ice hockey right wingers
Ice hockey people from Toronto
Los Angeles Kings players
National Hockey League first-overall draft picks
National Hockey League first-round draft picks
New York Islanders draft picks
New York Islanders players
Peterborough Petes (ice hockey) players
St. Catharines Saints players
Toronto Maple Leafs players
Toronto Marlboros players